Aneugmenus padi is a species of sawfly (order Hymenoptera, family Tenthredinidae).

Distribution and habitat 
This species is present in most of Europe, North Africa, Asia Minor and Transcaucasia. It has been introduced in western North America, in the northern coastal areas. These sawflies mainly inhabit low-growing vegetation on spruce forest edge.

Description
Head, antennae, and abdomen are entirely black, while legs are yellow, with infuscate tarsi at their apices. Thorax is black, with white tegula. Wings are lightly infuscate.

Biology
Adults can be found from May to September, while larvae are present from Spring to October. The main host plants of the oligophagous larvae of this species are bracken and other ferns (Pteridium aquilinum, Athyrium filix-femina and Dryopteris filix-mas).

References

External links
 Nature Spot
 Photo of larva on Flicrkiver

Tenthredinidae
Insects described in 1761
Taxa named by Carl Linnaeus